Memorial park complex of the heroes of the First World War is a park in Moscow, Russia. It is located in the Sokol District of the Northern Administrative Okrug. The area of the park is 11.2 hectares.

History
Earlier there was the Moscow City Bratsky (Fraternal) Cemetery on the place of the park. The cemetery was founded in 1915 by the Grand Duchess Elizabeth Feodorovna. Almost 18,000 victims of the World War I were buried in the cemetery. In 1918 the Church of the Transfiguration was built here by the prominent architect Alexey Shchusev.

In 1925 the Fraternal Cemetery was closed for burials. In 1932 it was turned into a park. All the tombstones, with the exception of one, were demolished. In the late 1940s the Church of the Transfiguration was demolished too. At the same time some blocks of buildings were built in the east part of the former cemetery. A cinema "Leningrad" and two cafes were built in the park later.

During perestroika many public figures spoke out for the revival of the memorial in the park, set on the site of the Moscow City Fraternal Cemetery. The Chapel of the Transfiguration was built there in 1998. In 2004 the park got the name "Memorial park complex of the heroes of the First World War" and some monuments were erected there. The remains of the Grand Duke Nicholas Nikolaevich and his wife Anastasia of Montenegro were re-buried in the Chapel of the Transfiguration in 2015.

Gallery

Bibliography 

Parks and gardens in Moscow
Cemeteries in Moscow
World War I cemeteries
Burials at Bratsky Cemetery, Moscow
Monuments and memorials in Moscow
Cultural heritage monuments of regional significance in Moscow